The 2011 Clarkson Cup was contested at the  Barrie Molson Centre in Barrie,  Ontario, Canada. The four competing teams included three from the Canadian Women's Hockey League and one from the Western Women's Hockey League. All teams played each other in a round robin Thursday March 24 through Saturday March 26, with the top two teams meeting in the final Sunday March 27. In 2010 the tournament consisted of just two semi-finals and a final. A change to the format this year has made the tournament longer.

Qualification

The top four teams from the CWHL competed in a tournament based on seedings. Seeds were determined by standings at end of regular season play. On March 11 and 12, the number 1 seed played against the number 2 seed while the number 3 seed challenged the number 4 seed. The victors competed on March 13 to determine the CWHL champion. The WWHL champion was the lone WWHL team to compete in the Clarkson Cup.

Boston Blades is eliminated and cannot participate in the Clarkson Cup Championship. Montreal Stars, Brampton Thunder and Toronto HC participated in the final tournament. The Minnesota Whitecaps of the WWHL complete the four teams.

Rosters

Brampton Thunder

Coaching Staff
    General Manager: Maria Quinto and Jody Katz
    Head Coach:  Peter Crosby
    Assistant Coach: Phil Bateman
    Assistant Coach: Kristi Alcorn

Montreal Stars

Coaching staff
    General Manager:  Megh Hewings
    Head Coach:Patrick Rankine
    Assistant Coach: Philipe Trahan

Minnesota Whitecaps

Coaching staff
 Head Coach:  Jack Brodt
 Assistant Coach: Dwayne Schmidgall
 Assistant Coach: Jim Minkoff

Toronto

Coaching Staff
General Manager: Barb Fisher
Head coach:  Dan Lichterman
Assistant coach: Joanne Eustace
Assistant coach: Bartley Blair

Tournament
In the first games, Toronto and Montreal earned victories over Brampton and Minnesota . In the second day, Sarah Vaillancourt scored 3 goals during the game to lead Montreal to a 7-4 victory over Brampton. In another match, Sami Jo Small celebrated her 35th birthday by stopping 40 shots to lead Toronto to a 6-0 win over Minnesota. The Championships tournament ran over the weekend. Saturday, Montreal scored a crucial victory 2-1 against Toronto. This win guaranteed Montreal a place in the Clarkson Cup final on Sunday against Toronto, who also recorded two victories in the tournament.

Championship game
March 27th Sunday: The final game concluded with the powerful Montreal team defeating Toronto  5 - 0. Montreal got off to a  2 - 0 lead in the first period, The first goal was scored by Noémie Marin on a backhand from her off wing at 14:47 as she converted a pass from Caroline Ouellette. The second goal was scored at 7:29 minute from a face off in the Toronto end as Dominique Thibault took the draw and Vanessa Davidson skated off the boards, picked up the puck and put a quick shot behind goaltender Sami Jo Small. The lone goal of the second period was scored at 10:36 by Sabrina Harbec  on a nice outside drive cutting by Annie Guay. Sabrina Harbec pulled the goalie across the crease and put the puck in the top corner. The shots at the end of the second period were 34 to 17 in favour of the Montreal Stars.

Montreal added two more goals in the third period to capture the 5-0 win Final game. At the 5:33 minute, Julie Chu feathered a  pass to Caroline Ouellette, who made a perfect low shot to score. The final goal of the game was scored with 2:42 left as Sarah Vaillancourt picked up a pass from  Caroline Ouellette  and she hit the mark on a quick shot from about five feet out. Toronto goalie Sami Jo Small played well in defeat as Montreal controlled the game outshooting Toronto 51 to 26. Toronto did threaten offensively early in the game and could have turned the contest around but Montreal goalie, Kim St-Pierre,  came up with exceptional saves to earn the shutout and ultimately crown Montreal Stars  the Clarkson Cup Champions 2011.

The Three Stars of the Game: First Star - Dominique Thibault, Montreal. Second Star - Vanessa Davidson, Montreal. Third Start - Jennifer Botterill, Toronto.

Awards and honours

See also
 Clarkson Cup
 2010 Clarkson Cup

References

Clarkson Cup
Clarkson Cup
Sport in Barrie
2011